The Rialto Bridge is the oldest of the four bridges spanning the Grand Canal in Venice, Italy.

History 

The first dry crossing of the Grand Canal was a pontoon bridge built in 1181 by Nicolò Barattieri. It was called the Ponte della Moneta, presumably because of the mint that stood near its eastern entrance.

The development and importance of the Rialto market on the eastern bank increased traffic on the floating bridge, so it was replaced in 1255 by a wooden bridge. This structure had two ramps meeting at a movable central section, that could be raised to allow the passage of tall ships. The connection with the market eventually led to a change of name for the bridge. During the first half of the 15th century, two rows of shops were built along the sides of the bridge. The rents brought an income to the State Treasury, which helped maintain the bridge.

Maintenance was vital for the timber bridge. It was partly burnt in the revolt led by Bajamonte Tiepolo in 1310. In 1444, it collapsed under the weight of a crowd rushing to see the marriage of the Marquis of Ferrara and it collapsed again in 1524.

The idea of rebuilding the bridge in stone was first proposed in 1503. Several projects were considered over the following decades. In 1551, the authorities requested proposals for the renewal of the Rialto Bridge, among other things. Plans were offered by famous architects, such as Jacopo Sansovino, Palladio and Vignola, but all involved a Classical approach with several arches, which was judged inappropriate to the situation. Michelangelo also was considered as designer of the bridge.

The present stone bridge, a single span designed by Antonio da Ponte, began to be constructed in 1588 and was completed in 1591. It is similar to the wooden bridge it succeeded. Two ramps lead up to a central portico. On either side of the portico, the covered ramps carry rows of shops. The engineering of the bridge was considered so audacious that architect Vincenzo Scamozzi predicted future ruin. The bridge has defied its critics to become one of the architectural icons, and top tourist attractions, in Venice.

Other names 
It was called Shylock's bridge in Robert Browning's poem "A Toccata of Galuppi's".

See also 
 Miracle of the Relic of the Cross at the Ponte di Rialto (depiction of wooden bridge)
 List of buildings and structures in Venice

References

External links 

Satellite image from Google Maps
 
 Rialto Bridge

Bridges completed in 1591
Bridges with buildings
Bridges in Venice
Covered bridges in Italy
Pedestrian bridges in Italy
Stone bridges in Italy
Tourist attractions in Venice
Wooden bridges in Italy
Failed terrorist attempts in Italy
Islamic terrorism in Italy